Paul Blagg (born 23 January 1960 in Guildford, Surrey) is a retired male race walker from England.

Athletics career
Blagg twice competed for Great Britain at the Summer Olympics (1988 and 1992). He set his personal best (3:59.55) in the 50 km race in 1987. He represented England in the 30 kilometres walk event, at the 1982 Commonwealth Games in Brisbane, Queensland, Australia.

Personal life
Blagg is now a successful trainer and rider in point to point horse races.

International competitions

References

sports-reference

1960 births
Living people
Sportspeople from Guildford
British male racewalkers
English male racewalkers
Commonwealth Games competitors for England
Olympic athletes of Great Britain
Athletes (track and field) at the 1982 Commonwealth Games
Athletes (track and field) at the 1988 Summer Olympics
Athletes (track and field) at the 1992 Summer Olympics
World Athletics Championships athletes for Great Britain